Clandestine Childhood is a 2011 Argentine historical drama film directed by Benjamín Ávila and starring Natalia Oreiro, Ernesto Alterio and César Troncoso.

Critically acclaimed, the film won ten awards from the Argentine Academy of Cinematography Arts and Sciences and five  awards from the Argentine Film Critics Association, including  the Silver Condor Award for Best Film, Best Director, Best Original Screenplay, Best Actress, and Best Supporting Actress. It was Argentina's submission for the 2013 Academy Award for Best Foreign Language Film to be presented in February 2013 at the 85th Academy Awards, but it did not make the final shortlist.

Synopsis
The story is set in the Dirty War time period and during Argentina's last military dictatorship (1976-1983). A married couple of guerrilla soldiers from Montoneros are living in Cuba with their two children. With the help of "Uncle Beto", they forge new identities and return to the country in 1979, with the aim of taking part in the leftist counteroffensive against the military junta. The events are narrated from the point of view of Juan, one of the couple's children.

Cast
 Natalia Oreiro as Cristina, alias Charo
 Ernesto Alterio as Uncle Beto
 César Troncoso as Horacio, alias Daniel
 Teo Gutiérrez Romero as Juan, alias Ernesto Estrada
 Cristina Banegas as Grandmother Amalia
 Douglas Simon as Gregorio
 Violeta Palukas as María
 Marcelo Mininno
 Mayana Neiva as Carmen

Production
The film is based on director Benjamín Ávila's childhood; his mother was affiliated with the Montoneros and disappeared during the last military dictatorship. The actors spent several days with former Montoneros, to understand both the sociopolitical context of the time and the daily life of Montoneros partisans.

Natalia Oreiro took part in the film before getting pregnant. She found that portraying the character was a difficult task, as the director wanted her to be both sweet and aggressive. Both Oreiro and co-star Ernesto Alterio criticized the tone of the film, pointing out that the parents exposed their children to situations that threatened their lives, and although the script does not explicitly condone the actions of the Montoneros, it is not critical of them, either.

Natalia Oreiro is married to Ricardo Mollo, vocalist and lead guitar of the Rock band Divididos. Benjamín Ávila invited the band to provide the soundtrack if they liked the film. Although he does not appear on screen, Mollo played the guitar during a scene with Oreiro singing a song by the tango artist Enrique Santos Discépolo.

Reception
The film was ranked as the 8th most seen film in Argentina at the premiere. As of September 2012, the film was sold to 20 countries.

Accolades
The film was submitted by the Argentine Academy of Cinematography Arts and Sciences to compete for the Best Foreign Language Oscar at the 85th Academy Awards. It prevailed over El último Elvis by a single vote, however the film did not receive a nomination.

See also
 List of submissions to the 85th Academy Awards for Best Foreign Language Film
 List of Argentine submissions for the Academy Award for Best Foreign Language Film

References

External links
 Official website
 
 
 Infancia Clandestina at Distribution Company website

2011 films
2011 romantic drama films
Brazilian romantic drama films
Dirty War films
Films set in Argentina
Films set in the 1970s
2010s Spanish-language films
Spanish romantic drama films
Argentine romantic drama films
2010s Argentine films